Arash Estilaf, known as Hua Bobo in China, is an Iranian actor and television presenter active in China. His birth name is Mohammadjavad Estilaf. He was born in Tehran, Iran and moved to China when he was 17 years old.

Estilaf moved to Shanghai in 2006 and began studying Chinese at East China Normal University. He could speak Chinese after three months. He was a contestant in the first Chinese Bridge language competition for foreign students in 2008, and he finished in the top 10.

In 2010 he entered in the Shanghai Theatre Academy in a master's degree course in broadcasting and presenting which he has now accomplished. He is now studying for a doctorate at the East China Normal University. Estilaf is fluent in Standard Mandarin and has made a name for himself on Chinese television with his humour. He can also speak Shanghainese and other languages like Korean and Russian.

Television

TV Programs

References

External links

Arash Estilaf website

Iranian emigrants to China
Chinese television presenters
East China Normal University alumni
Living people
Chinese television actors
Iranian television actors
People from Rasht
1988 births